Fatalmoudou Touré (born 1963) is a Malian middle-distance runner. She competed in the women's 800 metres at the 1980 Summer Olympics. She was the first woman to represent Mali at the Olympics.

References

External links
 

1963 births
Living people
Athletes (track and field) at the 1980 Summer Olympics
Malian female middle-distance runners
Olympic athletes of Mali
Place of birth missing (living people)
21st-century Malian people